Pogorelka is a rural locality (a village) in Klyazminskoye Rural Settlement, Kovrovsky District, Vladimir Oblast, Russia. The population was 33 as of 2010.

Geography 
Pogorelka is located 5 km east of Kovrov (the district's administrative centre) by road. Kovrov is the nearest rural locality.

References 

Rural localities in Kovrovsky District